Mesocricetus is a genus of Old World hamsters, including the Syrian or golden hamster, the first hamster to be introduced as a domestic pet, and still the most popular species of hamster for that purpose.

Recent research has shown that, unlike almost all other land mammals studied, all species of this genus lack the capacity for color vision.

Species
Mesocricetus auratus: Golden hamster or Syrian hamster
Mesocricetus brandti: Turkish hamster or Brandt's hamster
Mesocricetus newtoni: Romanian hamster or Dobrudja hamster
Mesocricetus raddei: Ciscaucasian hamster

Notes

References
http://www.funet.fi/pub/sci/bio/life/mammalia/rodentia/cricetidae/mesocricetus/

 
Rodent genera
Taxa named by Alfred Nehring